Warszawa Śródmieście railway station is a railway station in Warsaw, Poland, in the district of Śródmieście. The station serves the suburban (southern) tracks of the Warsaw Cross-City Line and is used by regional trains run by Koleje Mazowieckie (KM) and Szybka Kolej Miejska (SKM). There are two side platforms and one island platform serving two tracks, all located in a tunnel.

It was built on the principle of the Spanish solution, whereas the centre platform would be using for the arriving passengers only and the side platforms for departing passengers only. The separation was enforced by access controls to the centre platform (discontinued in 1960s), location of ticket offices next to side platforms only, and opening trains' doors on the centre platform side first and on the side platform side with a delay. The separation was in operation until the 1980s.

History
The first station with this name opened in 1949 in a cutting (now covered) on the Warsaw Cross-City Line between Marchlewskiego (currently Jana Pawła II) and Emilii Plater streets, a few hundred meters to the west of the current location. It had two side platforms and a simple wooden station building on the street level. It served both suburban and long-distance trains.

The present structure was built between 1955 and 1963. The overground part consists of two rectangular buildings without any facilities, being effectively oversized shelters for staircases leading to the platforms, ticket offices, etc. The station underwent a refurbishment in 2006–2007.

Connections
The station offers convenient ground-level transfers to the nearby Centrum metro station as well as a large number of trams and buses. The station is connected by an underground pedestrian passage to Warszawa Centralna, which serves long-distance trains, and Warszawa Śródmieście WKD, which serves Warszawska Kolej Dojazdowa trains.

Gallery

External links

Railway stations in Poland opened in 1949
Srodmiescie
Railway stations served by Koleje Mazowieckie
Railway stations served by Szybka Kolej Miejska (Warsaw)
Śródmieście, Warsaw